I Love the '80s 3-D is the sixth installment of the I Love the... series and the follow-up to VH1's 1980s nostalgia show I Love the '80s and its sequel I Love the '80s Strikes Back. It premiered October 24, 2005. Like its predecessors, it premiered in one-hour installments, each describing the events and trends of a year between 1980 and 1989, two shows per night until October 28, 2005.

The show is actually in 3D, using a process called ChromaDepth that appears in 3D when using a special pair of ChromaDepth glasses, but the process allows the show to be viewable in normal 2D (unlike the anaglyphic 3D process). The ChromaDepth glasses for the show were available free at Best Buy stores across the United States.

Commentators

Paula Abdul
Carlos Alazraqui
Brett Anderson
Harry Anderson
Antigone Rising (Cassidy and Kristen Henderson)
Bronson Arroyo
Shondrella Avery
Tim Bagley
Lance Bass
Michael Ian Black
Alonzo Bodden
Chris Booker
Bow Wow Wow (Leigh Gorman and Annabella Lwin)
Tom Bosley
Michael Buble
Bryan Callen
Larry Joe Campbell
Torry Castellano
Gary Cole
Stephen Collins
Bart Conner
Rachael Leigh Cook
Chris Coppola
Fred Coury
Jennifer Elise Cox
Molly Culver
Stephanie D'Abruzzo
Laura Dean
Dom DeLuise
Nick DiPaolo
The Donnas (Allison Robertson and Maya Ford)
Simon Doonan
Bil Dwyer
Nicole Eggert
Rich Eisen
Angie Everhart
Damien Fahey
Fat Joe
Adam Ferrara
Jerry Ferrara
Greg Fitzsimmons
Tyler Florence
Jake Fogelnest
Ben Folds
Drew Fraser
Doug E. Fresh
Dan Frischman
Max Gail
Jorge Garcia
Willie Garson
Jason George
Godfrey
Elon Gold
Genevieve Gorder
Gilbert Gottfried
Erin Gray
Annabelle Gurwitch
Luis Guzman
Alyson Hannigan
Har Mar Superstar
Hard 'n Phirm
Rachael Harris
Kevin Hart
Tony Hawk
John Heffron
Leona Helmsley
Marilu Henner
Don Herbert
Mark Hoppus
Clint Howard
Ken Howard
Joyce Hyser
Scott Ian
Jennifer Irwin
Ron Jeremy
Chris Jericho
Jake Johannsen
Aaron Karo
Monica Keena
Jo Koy
Harley Jane Kozak
David Krumholtz
Steve Landesberg
Emmanuel Lewis
Jesse Lewis IV
Lisa Lisa
Justin Long
Mario Lopez
Joe Lorge
Loni Love
Dolph Lundgren
Stephen Lynch
Kathleen Madigan
Jay Manuel
Ed Marinaro
Ross Mark
Biz Markie
Maroon 5 (Adam Levine and James Valentine)
Debbie Matenopoulos
Roberta Maxwell
Edwin McCain
Jay McCarroll
Darryl McDaniels
John Melendez
Daryl Mitchell
Modern Humorist (Michael Colton and John Aboud)
Billy Morrison
John Moschitta, Jr.
Shad Moss
Jason Mraz
Allison Munn
David Naughton
Nelson
Night Ranger (Jack Blades and Jeff Watson)
Graham Norton
Patrice O'Neal
Stuart Pankin
Tom Papa
Papa Roach
Freda Payne
Stephen Pearcy
Stephen Perkins
Ron Perlman
Cassandra Peterson
Brian Posehn
Megyn Price
Emily Procter
Missi Pyle
Rachel Quaintance
Riki Rachtman
Bob Read
Melissa Rivers
Mo Rocca
Darius Rucker
Dave Sabo
Donovan Scott
Stuart Scott
Kryss Shane
Sherri Shepherd
Brad Sherwood
Sir Mix-a-Lot
Dee Snider
Hal Sparks
Rick Springfield
Joel Stein
Fisher Stevens
French Stewart
Kirsten Storms
Michael Strahan
Brenda Strong
Nicole Sullivan
Alan Thicke
Lea Thompson
Gary Valentine
Countess Vaughn
Frank Vincent
John Waters
Evan Wecksell
Lauren Weedman
Kevin Weisman
Wil Wheaton
Jill Whelan
Jane Wiedlin
Chandra Wilson
Chuck Woolery
Chris Wylde
"Weird Al" Yankovic
Cedric Yarbrough
Zero Boy
Bob Zmuda
David Zucker

Recurring segments
 Movies That Should Have Been Made in 3-D: "Weird Al" Yankovic presents movies from the year that should have been made in 3-D but weren't. This is a reference to his album "Weird Al" Yankovic in 3-D.
 Teen Idols: Paula Abdul presents teen idols from each year.
 Best On-Screen Hookups: Chuck Woolery presents an on-screen hookup of each year.
 Biggest Boobs: Elvira, Mistress of the Dark, whose character costumes emphasize her ample bosom, presents the foolish or stupid people of each year.
 Hot Moms: Alan Thicke presents the sexually attractive mothers from each year.
 Pop Culture Terms: Emmanuel Lewis presents a slang word or phrase of each year.
 Guilty/Not Guilty: Harry Anderson judges a "trial" of a pop culture icon.
 The Year in Review: John Moschitta, a famed fast-talker who appeared in 1981 commercials for FedEx, gives a quick recap of each episode.
 During the credits of every episode, a clip from a popular music video was played without any type of commentary. These were usually replaced with a show promo by Vh1.

Topics covered by year

1980
Fame
Paul McCartney gets busted for marijuana possession in Japan
Ethnic Barbie dolls
Pepsi Challenge 
Richard Pryor burns himself
Fruit Roll-Ups
"Cars" by Gary Numan
Buck Rogers in the 25th Century
Post-it notes 
AC/DC's Back in Black album
Intellivision 
My Bodyguard
"Sailing" by Christopher Cross
The Jazz Singer
Fashion plates
Sugar Ray Leonard
The Elephant Man
Little Darlings

Movies of 1980 That Should Have Been Made in 3-D: 9 to 5 and Xanadu

Teen Idols of 1980: Scott Baio, Christopher Atkins and Michael Jackson

Best On-Screen Hookup of 1980: John Travolta and Debra Winger in Urban Cowboy

Biggest Boob of 1980: Rosie Ruiz cheating in the 84th Boston Marathon

Hot Moms of 1980: Ann Romano, Alice Hyatt and Vickie LaMotta

Pop Culture Term of 1980: Like (modifier)

Guilty/Not Guilty of 1980: That's Incredible! for inciting kids at home to imitate the stunts seen on the show despite having a "do not try this at home" warning (guilty)

The Year in Review 1980: Pepsi Challenge, Buck Rogers in the 25th Century, Sugar Ray Leonard, The Jazz Singer, My Bodyguard, Little Darlings, Richard Pryor burns himself, Paul McCartney gets busted for marijuana possession in Japan, The Elephant Man, Fruit Roll-Ups, ethnic Barbie dolls, fashion plates, AC/DC's Back in Black album and "Sailing" by Christopher Cross

1981
History of the World, Part I
Circus of the Stars
The first portable microcomputer
"Working for the Weekend" by Loverboy
Chariots of Fire
You Can't Do That on Television
Mud wrestling
"Hold On Loosely" by 38 Special
Escape from New York
Penny Racers
The Mediterranean fruit fly infestation
Barbara Mandrell and The Mandrell Sisters 
"Keep on Loving You" by REO Speedwagon
Body Heat
Erasermate 
Country stars crossing over to the mainstream (specifically Juice Newton and The Oak Ridge Boys)
Gimme a Break!
An American Werewolf in London

Movies of 1981 That Should Have Been Made in 3-D: Clash of the Titans, Arthur and My Dinner With Andre

Teen Idols of 1981: Timothy Hutton, Todd Bridges and Rick Springfield

Best On-Screen Hookup of 1981: Kermit the Frog and Miss Piggy in The Great Muppet Caper

Biggest Boob of 1981: Deborah Fountain of New York was disqualified at the Miss USA pageant

Hot Moms of 1981: Jane Fonda, Faye Dunaway and Barbara Eden

Pop Culture Term of 1981: Dude (noun)

Guilty/Not Guilty of 1981: Richard Simmons for wearing short shorts (guilty)

The Year in Review 1981: Penny Racers, Escape from New York, Chariots of Fire, Body Heat, You Can't Do That on Television, Barbara Mandrell and the Mandrell Sisters, country stars crossing over to the mainstream, Erasermate, the first portable microcomputer, History of the World, Part I, An American Werewolf in London, "Working for the Weekend" by Loverboy, Gimme a Break! and the Mediterranean fruit fly infestation

1982
Quest for Fire
VCRs
"Don't You Want Me" by The Human League
Cats
Tron
Freezy Freakies
"Rosanna" by Toto
BMX
Shopping malls
"I Want Candy" by Bow Wow Wow
Headbands and mesh tops shirts
The $25,000 Pyramid
EPCOT Center
Victor/Victoria
1982 Chicago Tylenol murders
Ripley's Believe It or Not!
First Blood

Movies of 1982 That Should Have Been Made in 3-D: Annie, Conan the Barbarian and Gandhi

Teen Idols of 1982: Ricky Schroder, Duran Duran and John Stamos

Best On-Screen Hookup of 1982: Dustin Hoffman and Jessica Lange in Tootsie

Biggest Boob of 1982: Larry Walters flew 16,000 feet up in the air using only a lawn chair with 45 helium weather balloons attached to it

Hot Moms of 1982: Meredith Baxter, Ms. Pac-Man and Isabel Sanford

Pop Culture Term of 1982: Gag Me With A Spoon (phrase)

Guilty/Not Guilty of 1982: Tommy Tutone for causing a fad of calling 867-5309 and asking for Jenny (guilty)

The Year in Review 1982: The $25,000 Pyramid, EPCOT Center, Quest for Fire, Cats, BMX, shopping malls, headbands & mesh tops shirts, First Blood, "Rosanna" by Toto, "I Want Candy" by Bow Wow Wow, "Don't You Want Me" by The Human League, VCRs and Victor/Victoria

1983
Jaws 3-D
Star Search
Monchhichis 
"Rockit" by Herbie Hancock
St. Elsewhere
Truly Tasteless Jokes 
Mr. Mom
Jheri curl
Jesse Jackson runs for President
Press Your Luck
ZZ Top
D.C. Cab
Reading Rainbow
Mr. Wizard's World
Strategic Defense Initiative ("Star Wars")
Quiet Riot
Terms of Endearment

Movies of 1983 That Should Have Been Made in 3-D: Scarface, Monty Python's The Meaning of Life and Return of the Jedi

Teen Idols of 1983: The entire cast of The Outsiders -- Patrick Swayze, Tom Cruise, Matt Dillon, C. Thomas Howell, Ralph Macchio and Emilio Estevez

Best On-Screen Hookup of 1983: Tom Cruise and Rebecca De Mornay in Risky Business

Biggest Boob of 1983: KISS taking off their makeup and revealing what they really looked like

Hot Moms of 1983: Beverly D'Angelo, Susan Clark and Jacqueline Bisset

Pop Culture Term of 1983: Hoser (adjective)

Guilty/Not Guilty of 1983: Cabbage Patch Kids for inciting riots in stores (guilty)

The Year in Review 1983: Jaws 3-D, Quiet Riot, Reading Rainbow, Truly Tasteless Jokes, Jheri curl, Mr. Mom, Terms of Endearment, ZZ Top, Star Search, Press Your Luck, Monchhichis, Jesse Jackson runs for President and D.C. Cab

1984
Red Dawn
Dr. Ruth
"One Night in Bangkok" by Murray Head
Band Aid
Children of the Corn
New Edition
Hair mousse
Amadeus
Doug Flutie's hail mary pass
"Rappin' Rodney" by Rodney Dangerfield
Voltron
Calculator watch
Romancing the Stone
Designer shoelaces
Snorks
PETA begins practice of throwing red paint
TV's Bloopers & Practical Jokes
Police Academy

Movies of 1984 That Should Have Been Made in 3-D: Splash, Breakin' and Purple Rain

Teen Idols of 1984: Menudo, Wham! and Corey Hart

Best On-Screen Hookup of 1984: Long Duk Dong and Lumberjack in Sixteen Candles

Biggest Boob of 1984: Walter Mondale uses Wendy's slogan "Where's the beef?" for his presidential election campaign

Hot Moms of 1984: Phylicia Rashad, Susan Saint James & Jane Curtin and Caren Kaye

Pop Culture Term of 1984: Boy Toy (phrase)

Guilty/Not Guilty of 1984: The FCC for allowing more time devoted to commercials resulting in the introduction of infomercials (guilty)

The Year in Review 1984: Dr. Ruth, Red Dawn, hair mousse, Romancing the Stone, Police Academy, Children of the Corn, "Rappin' Rodney" by Rodney Dangerfield and TV's Bloopers & Practical Jokes

1985
The Joy of Painting
Monster trucks
"Dancing in the Street" by Mick Jagger and David Bowie
Calvin Klein's Obsession
The Legend of Billie Jean
Phil Collins' No Jacket Required album
Joe Theismann gets his leg broken on Monday Night Football
My Buddy
"Weird Al" Yankovic
Just One of the Guys
Bernhard Goetz 
Sour Patch Kids
Brewster's Millions
Sally Field's Academy Awards speech
"Rhythm of the Night" by DeBarge
Spies Like Us
Rocky IV

Movies of 1985 That Should Have Been Made in 3-D: Gotcha! and Witness

Teen Idols of 1985: Michael J. Fox, Val Kilmer and Matthew Modine

Best On-Screen Hookup of 1985: Molly Ringwald and Judd Nelson in The Breakfast Club

Biggest Boob of 1985: David Lee Roth goes solo and parts ways with Van Halen

Hot Moms of 1985: Lea Thompson, Cher and Kelly McGillis

Pop Culture Term of 1985: Dweeb (noun)

Guilty/Not Guilty of 1985: Tipper Gore and the PMRC for the Parental Advisory Stickers (guilty)

The Year in Review 1985: Sally Field's Academy Awards speech, The Joy of Painting, The Legend of Billie Jean, My Buddy, Sour Patch Kids, "Weird Al" Yankovic, Calvin Klein's Obsession, Phil Collins' No Jacket Required album, Joe Theismann gets his leg broken on Monday Night Football, Rocky IV, monster trucks, Bernhard Goetz, Brewster's Millions and "Dancing in the Street" by Mick Jagger & David Bowie

1986
Back to School
Love Connection
Madballs 
"We Don't Have to Take Our Clothes Off" by Jermaine Stewart
Murder, She Wrote
Muammar Gaddafi
The Color of Money
Short Circuit
Snuggle 
Not Necessarily the News
Memorex tapes
Lucas
Head of the Class
Heart's Heart album
Halley's Comet
Three Amigos

Movies of 1986 That Should Have Been Made In 3-D: Pretty in Pink, Aliens and Cobra

Teen Idols of 1986: Malcolm Jamal Warner, Andrew McCarthy and River Phoenix

Best On-Screen Hookup of 1986: Mallory Keaton and Nick Moore on Family Ties

Biggest Boob of 1986: Geraldo Rivera and the opening of Al Capone's vault on live TV

Hot Moms of 1986: Cindy Pickett, Deidre Hall and Judith Light

Pop Culture Term of 1986: Poser (noun)

Guilty/Not Guilty of 1986: Don Johnson for his song and video "Heartbeat" (guilty)

The Year in Review 1986: Three Amigos, Snuggle, Head of the Class, "We Don't Have to Take Our Clothes Off" by Jermaine Stewart, Love Connection, Short Circuit, Memorex tapes, Muammar Gaddafi, Back to School, Heart's Heart album, Madballs, Murder, She Wrote, Halley's Comet and The Color of Money

1987
Predator
Oral Roberts asks for $8,000,000
Max Headroom
"Mony Mony" by Billy Idol
The Legend of Zelda
Moonstruck
Baby Jessica falls down a well
Lee Press-On nails
Throw Momma from the Train
Microwave oven
Ozone depletion
Spenser: For Hire
Black Monday
Mannequin
The bolo tie
"(I Just) Died in Your Arms" by Cutting Crew
Kelly LeBrock Pantene advertisements
Star Trek: The Next Generation
Lethal Weapon

Movies of 1987 That Should Have Been Made in 3-D: Roxanne, Three Men and a Baby and Ishtar

Teen Idols of 1987: Patrick Dempsey, Kirk Cameron and Johnny Depp

Best On-Screen Hookup of 1987: Michael Douglas and Glenn Close in Fatal Attraction

Biggest Boob of 1987: The people of Italy have elected Ilona Staller into the Italian Parliament

Hot Moms of 1987: Anne Schedeen, Katey Sagal and Mel Harris

Pop Culture Term of 1987: Skank (noun)

Guilty/Not Guilty of 1987: Tammy Faye Bakker for wearing too much makeup (guilty)

The Year in Review 1987: Moonstruck, Baby Jessica falls down a well, Spenser: For Hire, Star Trek: The Next Generation, Black Monday, Oral Roberts asks for $8,000,000, microwave oven, Kelly LeBrock Pantene advertisements and Lethal Weapon

1988
Twins
The party line
Cher and Rob Camiletti
"Hot Hot Hot" by Buster Poindexter
Cocktail and "Kokomo" by The Beach Boys
Micro Machines 
"Kiss Me Deadly" by Lita Ford
Unsolved Mysteries
Midnight Run
Jimmy the Greek's racist comments
"Beds Are Burning" by Midnight Oil
The rattail
The Morton Downey Jr. Show
It's Garry Shandling's Show
Mike Tyson's Punch-Out!!
Tanning beds
"Forever Young" by Rod Stewart
The Naked Gun: From the Files of Police Squad!

Movies of 1988 That Should Have Been Made in 3-D: Rain Man, Caddyshack II and Elvira, Mistress of the Dark

Teen Idols of 1988: The Two Coreys, Michael Hutchence and Jason Bateman

Best On-Screen Hookup of 1988: Susan Sarandon, Tim Robbins, and Kevin Costner in Bull Durham

Biggest Boob of 1988: Dan Quayle's misstatement on the Vice President's responsibility

Hot Moms of 1988: Demi Moore, Katherine Helmond and Joanna Kerns

Pop Culture Term of 1988: P.C. - Politically Correct (phrase)

Guilty/Not Guilty of 1988: Sherman Hemsley for making a spin-off show Amen (not guilty)

The Year in Review 1988: Midnight Run, It's Garry Shandling's Show, "Hot Hot Hot" by Buster Poindexter, Cher & Rob Camiletti, "Kiss Me Deadly" by Lita Ford, Jimmy the Greek's racist comments, Unsolved Mysteries, The Naked Gun: From the Files of Police Squad!, Cocktail, the party line, "Beds Are Burning" by Midnight Oil, the rattail, tanning beds and Micro Machines

1989
Rescue 911
The Little Mermaid
"She Drives Me Crazy" by Fine Young Cannibals
The Exxon Valdez oil spill
Honey, I Shrunk the Kids
Mr. Bean 
Leona Helmsley convicted of tax evasion
Paula Abdul
Road House
Super Bowl XXIII
The Noid 
The hi-top fade haircut
The Satanic Verses controversy
Parenthood
Kim Basinger buys a town
"Close My Eyes Forever" by Ozzy Osbourne and Lita Ford
The B-2 bomber
Steel Magnolias

Movies of 1989 That Should Have Been Made in 3-D: Turner & Hooch, Dream a Little Dream and UHF

Teen Idols of 1989: New Kids on the Block, Christian Slater and John Cusack

Best On-Screen Hookup of 1989: Billy Crystal and Meg Ryan in When Harry Met Sally

Biggest Boob of 1989: RJ Reynolds Tobacco Company "smokeless" cigarette, Premier

Hot Moms of 1989: Julia Roberts, Kirstie Alley and Marge Simpson

Pop Culture Term of 1989: Have A Cow (phrase)

Guilty/Not Guilty of 1989: CBS executives for inflicting The Pat Sajak Show on America (guilty)

The Year in Review 1989: The B-2 bomber, Kim Basinger buys a town, Super Bowl XXIII, "She Drives Me Crazy" by Fine Young Cannibals, the Noid, Leona Helmsley convicted of tax evasion, Honey, I Shrunk the Kids, Steel Magnolias, Rescue 911, The Satanic Verses controversy, "Close My Eyes Forever" by Ozzy Osbourne and Lita Ford, Paula Abdul, Road House, The Little Mermaid and the Exxon Valdez oil spill

External links
 
 I Love the 80's 3-D on Internet Archive

Nostalgia television shows
Nostalgia television in the United States
VH1 original programming
2000s American television miniseries
2005 American television series debuts
2005 American television series endings